Lucy Hanna is an American artist, photographer, and filmmaker based in Seattle, Washington and San Francisco, California.

Hanna directed the film Shaken & Stirred (2009) and has photographed Mia Zapata, a Seattle singer that fronted the punk band The Gits.

Life and work
Hanna moved from Wichita, Kansas to Seattle, Washington in 1989 and photographed the Seattle music scene during the 1990s.

She has a Bachelor of Arts degree in Film and Sculpture and has attended the San Francisco Art Institute (SFAI) studying under artist Tony Labat and filmmaker Jay Rosenblatt.

Hanna's photographs of Mia Zapata, a Seattle singer that fronted the punk band The Gits, were included prominently in the 2008 documentary film The Gits and were included in the 2003 reissue of the Gits album Enter: The Conquering Chicken and in periodicals SPIN, CMJ, Seattle Weekly, Dazed & Confused, Rockrgirl, The Seattle Times, and Rolling Stone. They were also used in episodes of the television shows 48 Hours and Dateline NBC.

She appeared (along with Tad Doyle of the band TAD) in Paul Westerberg's "Dyslexic Heart" music video from the motion picture Singles.

Films 

 Shaken & Stirred (2009) – director

References

External links 

 

American photographers
American women photographers
Artists from San Francisco
Artists from Wichita, Kansas
Filmmakers from Seattle
Living people
San Francisco Art Institute alumni
Year of birth missing (living people)
21st-century American women